was a tram line in the Japanese city of Kawasaki, Kanagawa Prefecture. The 6.7 km line ran from Shiden Kawasaki (in front of Kawasaki Station) to Shiohama Station (now closed). The tramway operated from 1944 to 1969. A street on the former route is named .

References

Tram transport in Japan
Railway companies of Japan
Railway companies established in 1944
Railway companies disestablished in 1969
1944 establishments in Japan
1969 disestablishments in Japan
Kawasaki